Jaworek may refer to:

Places in Poland
Jaworek, Kłodzko County in Lower Silesian Voivodeship (south-west Poland)
Jaworek, Ząbkowice Śląskie County in Lower Silesian Voivodeship (south-west Poland)
Jaworek, Łódź Voivodeship (central Poland)
Jaworek, Gostynin County in Masovian Voivodeship (east-central Poland)
Jaworek, Węgrów County in Masovian Voivodeship (east-central Poland)
Jaworek, Opole Voivodeship (south-west Poland)

People
 Tomasz Jaworek, Polish footballer